Zahed Kola (also Romanized as Zāhed Kolā) is a village in Emamzadeh Abdollah Rural District, Dehferi District, Fereydunkenar County, Mazandaran Province, Iran. At the 2006 census, its population was 524, in 126 families.

References 

Populated places in Fereydunkenar County